Yummy is the thirteenth studio album by KC and the Sunshine Band, released in 2007. The album was released following a six-year gap after their last complete studio album.

Track listing
"Git Off" (Harry Wayne Casey, John Tomas, Francisco Del) – 3:31
"Satisfy Me" (Tomas, Del) – 3:37
"Let Me See You Move" (Casey) – 2:47
"Dance Baby Dance" (Del) – 3:57
"When It Comes to Love" (Casey) – 3:37
"Hard" (Casey) – 3:13
"Do It" (Casey, Joseph King, Alvoid Robinson) – 4:26
"Yummy" (Casey) – 3:47
"Love Disappears" (Casey, Jeffrey Gaines, S. Quinn) – 3:35
"Don't Stop" (Michael Jackson) – 5:36
"You're My Friend" (Casey) – 5:25
"Secret World" (Peter Gabriel) – 8:14

Personnel
Harry Wayne Casey – keyboards, vocal
Amaury López – keyboards
J. T. Thomas – keyboards
Amos Larkins – keyboards
Adrian Garcia – synthesizer
David Cabrera – guitar, rapping, background vocal
Andy "Divine" Englund (aka Anders Englund, Kuzey Gustavsson) – guitar
Manny López – guitar
Herbert Heck – bass guitar
Herbert Byrne – bass guitar
Orlando Hernandez – bass guitar
Harold Seay – bass guitar
Francisco "STAR" Del – drum programming, French horn, rapping, background vocal, keyboards, songwriter, producer
Lester Mendez – drum programming
Steve Roitstein – drum programming
Tony Conception – trumpet
Dana Teboe – trombone
Ed Calle – saxophone
Bobby Martinez – saxophone, horn
Alex Dean – saxophone
Ed Dana – horn
Tony Keyes – horn
Jon Williams – background vocals
Thomas Hatcher – background vocals
Shanida Williams – background vocals
Astrid Stienman – background vocals
E. J. Waters – background vocals
Maria DeCrescenzo – rapping, background vocals
Beverly Champion Foster – rapping, background vocals
Rita Quintero – background vocals
Ezara Sanders – background vocals
Shenita Hunt – background vocals
Felicia Franklin – background vocals
George Noriega – background vocals
Astrid Pazmino – background vocals
Wendy Pederson – background vocals

References

KC and the Sunshine Band albums
2007 albums
Pop albums by American artists